Guanyin is a town in Xuzhou District, Yibin, Sichuan province, China. , it has seven residential neighborhoods and 42 villages under its administration:
Neighborhoods
Guanyin Community
Wanjing Community
Xujia Community
Nanhua Community
Shagou Community
Guluo Community
Liangfeng Community
 
Villages
Qunzhong Village
Panshan Village
Zhouchang Village
Fengzhu Village
Shuangyu Village
Xicao Village
Xinxing Village
Yinjia Village
Huajia Village
Datong Village
Jixiang Village
Maoping Village
Fenshui Village
Shulou Village
Shouchang Village
Hongju Village
Limin Village
Leidian Village
Xiaowan Village
Wayao Village
Panlong Village
Tuhong Village
Shimiao Village
Chenhe Village
Hehua Village
Gutang Village
Guangxue Village
Zhongxiu Village
Songxian Village
Helin Village
Huli Village
Guluo Village
Youzhi Village
Wanshan Village
Liushu Village
Yeshan Village
Xinyan Village
Chahua Village
Liangfeng Village
Dawu Village
Dajing Village
Baiguo Village

See also 
 List of township-level divisions of Sichuan

References 

Towns in Sichuan
Administrative divisions of Yibin